Khalid Ali (born March 24, 1981) is an Emirati football defender who played for United Arab Emirates at the 2004 AFC Asian Cup.

References 

Living people
Emirati footballers
United Arab Emirates international footballers
Association football defenders
2004 AFC Asian Cup players
Al Jazira Club players
Khor Fakkan Sports Club players
Place of birth missing (living people)
Footballers at the 2002 Asian Games
UAE Pro League players
Asian Games competitors for the United Arab Emirates
1981 births